Anders Wiklund (born May 1, 1949 in Borlänge) is a Swedish Left Party politician, member of the Riksdag 2002–2006 representing Dalarna County.

References

Members of the Riksdag from the Left Party (Sweden)
Living people
1949 births
Members of the Riksdag 2002–2006
People from Borlänge Municipality
21st-century Swedish politicians